Kong Sham Western Highway, formerly known as the Deep Bay Link is a highway in Hong Kong. Its northern end is at Ngau Hom Shek, near Deep Bay, and its southern end is at Lam Tei, in Tuen Mun District. Together with the Hong Kong–Shenzhen Western Corridor, it forms the Route 10 of the Hong Kong Strategic Route and Exit Number System and provides road access from Hong Kong to the mainland. The link itself consists of 108,000 m2 of deck space over 3,014 segments.

History
The road was built as initiative from the Crosslinks Further Study, which highlighted the need for another vehicular cross-border link between Hong Kong and Shenzhen. At the date of the study (2001), there were three existing vehicular border crossings, located at Lok Ma Chau, Man Kam To and Sha Tau Kok. At that time, these links were nearing saturation and were expected to reach their maximum handling capacity by 2006. As a result, the government of Hong Kong proposed the Shenzhen Western Corridor and Deep Bay Link as an additional vehicular border crossing to provide additional cross-border road infrastructure.

The Environmental Protection Department of the Government of Hong Kong carried out an environmental impact assessment, and found that the environmental impact of the Deep Bay Link and associated carriageways will not be significantly adverse. The assessment however noted that Deep Bay Link might cause localized environmental impact, further detailed in the Feasibility Study for Additional Cross-border Links. The Deep Bay Link was therefore given the necessary environmental permit from the department.

The link's approved project cost is HK$4,600 million. The construction began in June 2003, and was commissioned in July 2007. The construction of the carriageway was split into two parts; northern and southern sections. China State Construction joint venture was in charge of the southern section.

Interchanges

Landmarks
The carriageway originates in the Lam Tei area, and passes through Ha Tsuen. Ling Lo Tsz, a Chinese temple, is accessible from a branch road off the carriageway.

See also
List of expressways in Hong Kong

References

External links 

 

Expressways in Hong Kong
Lam Tei
Route 10 (Hong Kong)
Viaducts in Hong Kong
Yuen Long District